Peter Burger (born 23 October 1954) was a Swiss modern pentathlete. He competed at the 1988 Summer Olympics.

References

External links
 

1954 births
Living people
Modern pentathletes at the 1988 Summer Olympics
Olympic modern pentathletes of Switzerland
Swiss male modern pentathletes